Adama Sarr (born 15 March 1991) is a Senegalese professional footballer who plays as a forward.

Professional career
Sarr signed for Football Bourg-en-Bresse Péronnas 01 in the summer on 2 June 2017 after successful seasons in the lower divisions of France. He made his professional debut with FBBP in a 2–0 Ligue 2 loss to FC Sochaux-Montbéliard on 28 July 2017.

References

External links

FBBP Profile

Living people
1991 births
Footballers from Dakar
Association football forwards
Senegalese footballers
Red Star F.C. players
US Quevilly-Rouen Métropole players
Football Bourg-en-Bresse Péronnas 01 players
Paris FC players
Ligue 2 players
Championnat National players
Liga I players
CS Gaz Metan Mediaș players
Senegalese expatriate footballers
Senegalese expatriate sportspeople in France
Expatriate footballers in France
Senegalese expatriate sportspeople in Romania
Expatriate footballers in Romania